Ramón Reyes (8 October 1937 – 23 May 2014) was a Panamanian basketball player. He competed in the men's tournament at the 1968 Summer Olympics.

References

1937 births
2014 deaths
Panamanian men's basketball players
Olympic basketball players of Panama
Basketball players at the 1968 Summer Olympics
Sportspeople from Panama City